The 1985 World Judo Championships were the 14th edition of the World Judo Championships, and were held in Seoul, South Korea from September 26–29, 1985.

Medal overview

Men

Medal table

Links 
 

W
J
World Judo Championships
Judo Championships
Sport in Seoul